Belgrano II Base is a permanent, all year-round Argentine Antarctic base and scientific research station named after General Manuel Belgrano, one of the Libertadores and the creator of the Argentine Flag. It is located on Bertrab Nunatak on the Confín Coast, Coats Land.

 it is Argentina's southernmost permanent base, the world's third furthest south permanent base, and the world's southernmost base built on solid rock, which makes it particularly suited for geological research.

 Belgrano II is one of 13 research stations in Antarctica operated by Argentina.

History
In 1955, then Brigade General Hernán Pujato founded the first Belgrano Base (Belgrano I), which remained for years as Argentina's southernmost settlement.

After a continuous activity for 25 years, Belgrano I was closed due to the fast deterioration of the ice barrier it was sitting on; new, often hidden cracks and crevices endangered the on-duty personnel and material. In order to continue the scientific programs and keep Argentina presence in the area, and after careful studies on alternative locations done by the Argentine Army, it was decided to lay the new facilities on solid land. Amid the vast expanse of ice that covers the region, only two small masses of granite emerge: the Moltke and Bertrab nunataks, both first sighted and named by Filchner's expedition in 1912.
Belgrano II was founded on 5 February 1979 over the latter, a hectare of permanently ice-free land. Also and despite being farther south and higher than Belgrano I, the climate was significantly milder.

The unloading of the materials—equipment, tools and instruments, food and fuel—was conducted from the icebreaker ARA General San Martín.

The new housing facilities were a vast improvement over the previous base ones: since 1955, the men who wintered in the old Belgrano I Base were living inside tunnels dug in the ice, ice that was always moving slowly towards the sea and, as finally happened, would become a tabular iceberg drifting through the Southern Ocean.

In its area of influence two Argentine-built refuges existed since long before: the Sargento Ayudante Cisterna y el Aviso ARA Comandante Zapiola shelters had been set up in January 1976.

In addition to new instruments brought from the mainland, Belgrano II received all the scientific equipment transferred from Belgrano I. The LABEL laboratory (LAboratory BELgrano) was rebuilt demanding considerable effort. A new facility, the José Luis Sersic polar astronomical observatory and a satellite dish antenna for data transmission were also set up.

On the morning of 10 September 2005 the main house was completely destroyed as a result of a fire caused by a heater malfunction. Personnel had to be distributed to other buildings and new food and clothes had to be brought from the mainland and airdropped as the fire had destroyed all the wintering elements. The construction of emergency facilities to solve the housing problem started in early 2006, This new building was planned in two stages with the first one (bathrooms, kitchen and bedrooms) being finished in 2006–07 and the second one (living room), in 2007–08. During the 2008–09 campaign the construction of a new main house began. It was completed during the 2009–10 campaign and was inaugurated on 25 May 2010.

During the repairs of the Argentine Navy icebreaker ARA Almirante Irízar which is normally used to supply the base, the Argentine Air Force took over the task with airdrops by KC-130 Hercules aircraft in a non-stop flight from Ushuaia in Tierra del Fuego.

Historic site
This has been designated a Historic Site or Monument, following a proposal by Argentina to the Antarctic Treaty Consultative Meeting.

Description
It is also the world's southmost base built on solid rock, which gives it unique advantages for seismological and geological research.

As a result of its latitude, the summer day and winter night are four months long and the night sky often displays the aurora australis.

Structures are mostly of composite panels covered by metal or fiberglass filled with polyurethane foam to provide adequate thermal insulation to resist low temperatures. Some of the facilities at the base are: main and personnel houses; emergency house/infirmary; airstrip; heliport; chapel; museum; radio station; meteorological station; power plant; vehicle fleet (several Tucker Sno-Cats and Yamaha VK-541 ski-doos); atmospheric research station; mechanical, carpentry and electricity workshop; general equipment and spare parts warehouses; and foodstuff deposits (also called GUM).
It has x-ray and odontological facilities.
Dug in the nearby ice, Belgrano II's Catholic Chapel of Our Lady of the Snows is the world's southernmost Christian church—in fact, it's the southernmost worship place of any religion.

The general tasks of the base personnel are primarily of scientific research, survey and exploration, also providing support for foreign scientific efforts.
Other common duties are shelter maintenance, search and rescue, medical, communications and weather forecast support to expeditions, bases, ships and aircraft, both local and foreign.

Scientific activity
The following research programs are run at LABEL:
 Meteorology forecast
 Atmospheric ozone research with high altitude probes and a Brewer spectrophotometer from the World Meteorological Organization, a joint program with Italy; and EVA IFAR spectrophotometer, a joint program with INTA in Spain 
 Astrolabel, through optical telescope, an agreement with the Astronomical Observatory of Córdoba) 
 Solar radiation and energy resources study through the local satellite station transmitting data in real time; since February 1998 a geodetic GPS receiver and seismological recording station have been installed through a joint program with the Alfred Wegener Institute of Germany; 
 Seismography, operating the world's southernmost seismograph over firm rock
 Analysis of Earth's magnetic field variations 
 Ionospheric and aurorae sounding research in cooperation with Italy
 Riometry, cosmic noise analysis
 Bird monitoring and nesting patterns
 Geodesy, through GPS and a Doris beacon

Although maintained by the Argentine Armed Forces, as all Argentine bases on Antarctica, it is operated by the civilian agency Argentine Antarctic Institute. 
, the base has a 19 men crew two of whom are Air Force meteorologists, three are Argentine National Antarctic Directorate civilian researchers and the rest is Argentine Army personnel in charge of operating the base.

Climate
The Belgrano II base has a coastal-influenced ice cap climate.

The area is a passage of weather fronts directed towards the north: although they do not precipitate, they do produce strong winds exceeding  which radically increase the chill factor.

During the polar night, a lot of aurorae can be observed.

Snowfall occurs throughout the year; on average, there are 143 days with snow. January to April are the snowiest periods of the year with each month receiving 13 to 14 days with snow.

See also
 Argentine Antarctica
 List of Antarctic research stations
 List of Antarctic field camps

References

External links

 Fundaciòn Marambio – Base Belgrano II 
 Dirección Nacional del Antártico

Belgrano II
Populated places established in 1979
Historic Sites and Monuments of Antarctica
Coats Land
1979 establishments in Antarctica